In Australian constitutional law, Chapter III Courts are courts of law which are a part of the Australian federal judiciary and thus are able to discharge Commonwealth judicial power. They are so named because the prescribed features of these courts are contained in Chapter III of the Australian Constitution.

Separation of powers in Australia

The doctrine of separation of powers refers to a system of government whereby three aspects of government powerlegislative power, executive power, and judicial powerare vested in separate institutions. This doctrine holds that abuse of power can be avoided by each arm of government acting as a check on another. In Australia, this separation is implied in the structure of the Constitution. Chapter I outlines legislative powerthe making, altering or repealing of laws; Chapter II outlines executive powerthe general and detailed carrying on of governmental functions; Chapter III outlines judicial powerthe interpretation of law, and adjudication according to law.

What constitutes a Chapter III Court
Federal courts must have those features contained in Chapter III of the Constitution of Australia.

These features serve two purposes: firstly, they prescribe the features of any court created by the federal government; and secondly, they serve as criteria when deciding whether a body qualifies as a Chapter III Court.

The main feature of a Chapter III Court is security of tenure. Under Section 72 of the Constitution, justices of federal courts are to be appointed by the Governor-General in Council; have a term of office lasting until they are 70 years of age (unless Parliament legislates to reduce this maximum age before their appointment); and receive a remuneration which must not diminish during their term in office.

Chapter III judges cannot be removed except upon an address from both houses of the Parliament of Australia in the same session, "praying for such removal on the ground of proved misbehaviour or incapacity". Thus, a judge cannot be removed except in the most extraordinary of circumstances. The only instance where the situation has even been close to arising was during the tenure of Justice Murphy of the High Court. However, he died in 1986 before procedures to remove him could begin.

What constitutes judicial power
Judicial power is not defined in the Australian Constitution. Instead, it must be determined by reference to seven indicia, viz:
 binding and conclusive decisions
 enforceability
 decisions made about existing rights or duties
 discretion limited to situations with legally ascertainable tests
 need for a controversy
 opinion of the drafters of the Constitution
 nature of the body on which power is conferred

Chapter III Courts as principal repositories of Commonwealth judicial power
The judicial power of the Commonwealth can be exercised only by a Chapter III Court or by a state court in which Commonwealth judicial power has been vested under s 77(iii) of the Constitution (although the reverse is not possible). In New South Wales v Commonwealth (1915) (The Wheat Case), the High Court held that judicial power is vested in a court as described under Chapter III, and no other body can exercise judicial power. In that case, it was held that the Inter-State Commission could not exercise judicial power despite the words of the Constitution, because it appeared in Chapter IV of the Constitution, and not Chapter III. More importantly, the Commission was set up by the executive and violated the conditions for being a Chapter III court.

There are some exceptions to the rule. Firstly, judicial power may be given to a non-judicial agent provided the judges still bear the major responsibility for exercise of the power and the exercise of power is subject to court review. 

Secondly, there are four discrete exceptions:
 contempt of Parliament
 courts-martial
 public service tribunals
 detention
 of non-citizens
 of the mentally ill or those with infectious diseases
 by police for a limited period of time
 for the welfare/protection of a person

Chapter III Courts wielding non-judicial power
A Chapter III Court cannot discharge powers other than judicial power, except where the function is ancillary to the purpose of the judicial function. In The Boilermakers' Case, the High Court held that a court that discharges both arbitration and judicial powers was invalid. The majority justices held that the maintenance of the constitutional system of government required a rigid adherence to separation of powers.

The only exception to this rule is the discharge of functions ancillary to the exercise of judicial power. Section 51 (xxxix) of the Constitution allows the Parliament to vest in Chapter III courts any power incidental to its exercise of judicial power. This exception has in subsequent cases been used to allow courts to be vested with wide-ranging powers. Thus, in R v Joske; Ex parte Australian Building Construction Employees and Builders' Labourers' Federation, powers such as reorganising unions and invalidating union rules were allowed to be exercised by a Chapter III court.

However, the exclusion of non-judicial power from a Chapter III court does not preclude individual justices from performing non-judicial functions, provided that they do so in their personal capacity; that is, they act as "persona designata".

Appeals to the Privy Council
The issue of appeals from the High Court to the United Kingdom's Judicial Committee of the Privy Council was a significant one during the drafting of the Constitution and it continued to be significant in the years after the court's creation. The wording of section 74 of the constitution that was put to voters in the various colonies was that there was to be no appeal to the Privy Council in any matter involving the interpretation of the Constitution or of the Constitution of a State, unless it involved the interests of some other dominion. However, the British insisted on a compromise. Section 74 as ultimately enacted by the Imperial Parliament was as follows:No appeal shall be permitted to the Queen in Council in any matter involving the interpretation of this Constitution or of the Constitution of a State from a decision of the High Court upon any question, howsoever arising, as to the limits inter se of the Constitutional powers of the Commonwealth and those of any State or States, or as to the limits inter se of the Constitutional powers of any two or more States, unless the public interests of some part of Her Majesty's Dominions, other than the Commonwealth or a State, are involved. the High Court shall certify that the question is one which ought to be determined by Her Majesty in Council.

The High Court may so certify if satisfied that for any special reason the certificate should be granted, and thereupon an appeal shall lie to Her Majesty in Council on the question without further leave.

Except as provided in this section, this Constitution shall not impair any right which the Queen may be pleased to exercise, by virtue of Her Royal Prerogative, to grant special leave of appeal from the High Court to Her Majesty in Council. But The Parliament may make laws limiting the matters in which such leave may be asked, but proposed laws containing any such limitation shall be reserved by the Governor-General for Her Majesty’s pleasure.

Section 74 did provide that the parliament could make laws to prevent appeals to the Privy Council and it did so, beginning in 1968, with the Privy Council (Limitation of Appeals) Act 1968, which closed off all appeals to the Privy Council in matters involving federal legislation. In 1975, the Privy Council (Appeals from the High Court) Act 1975 was passed, which had the effect of closing all routes of appeal from the High Court. Appeals from the High Court to the Privy Council are now only theoretically possible in inter se matters if the High Court grants a certificate of appeal under section 74 of the Constitution. In 1985, the High Court unanimously observed that the power to grant such a certificate "has long since been spent" and is "obsolete". In 1986, with the passing of the Australia Act by both the UK Parliament and the Parliament of Australia (with the request and consent of the Australian states, in accordance with Section 51(xxxviii)), appeals to the Privy Council from State Supreme Courts were closed off, leaving the High Court as the only avenue of appeal.

List of Chapter III courts
 High Court of Australia
 Federal Court of Australia
 Family Court of Australia
 Federal Circuit Court of Australia

See also
 Separation of powers
 Australian court hierarchy
 Judiciary of Australia
 Constitution of Australia
 Article I and Article III tribunals—analogous feature of the US federal court system

References

External links
 Australian Courts & Legislation

Australian constitutional law